Máel Muire ingen Cináeda was a daughter of Kenneth MacAlpin, King of Dal Riáta. She married two important Irish kings of the Uí Néill. Her first husband was Aed Finliath of the Cenél nEógain, King of Ailech and High King of Ireland. Niall Glúndub, ancestor of the O'Neill, was the son of this marriage.

Her second husband was Flann Sinna of Clann Cholmáin, King of Mide and also High King of Ireland. As the daughter, wife and mother of kings, when Máel Muire died in 913, her death was reported by the Annals of Ulster, an unusual thing for the male-centred chronicles of that time.

See also

 Máel Muire (female name)

9th-century Irish women
Irish princesses
9th-century Irish people
10th-century Irish people
Irish royal consorts
Remarried royal consorts
10th-century Irish women